Camillo Ciano (born 22 February 1990) is an Italian professional footballer who plays for  club Benevento.

Career
In summer 2014, Ciano was signed by Parma. On 1 September 2014 he was sent to Crotone on a two-year loan deal.

As of the summer of 2015, he has played for Cesena.

On 27 August 2022, Ciano agreed to move to Benevento from Frosinone, with Roberto Insigne moving in the opposite direction in exchange.

References

External links
 
 

1990 births
People from Marcianise
Footballers from Campania
Living people
Italian footballers
Italy youth international footballers
Association football forwards
Serie A players
Serie B players
Serie C players
S.S.C. Napoli players
Calcio Lecco 1912 players
Parma Calcio 1913 players
F.C. Crotone players
Calcio Padova players
U.S. Avellino 1912 players
A.C. Cesena players
Frosinone Calcio players
Benevento Calcio players
Sportspeople from the Province of Caserta